The Canton of Perpignan-5 is a French canton of Pyrénées-Orientales department, in Occitanie.

Composition

At the French canton reorganisation which came into effect in March 2015, the canton was expanded from 1 to 2 communes:
Canohès  
Perpignan (southwestern part)

Before 2015, the canton included only the following neighbourhoods of Perpignan:
 Saint-Martin
 Mailloles
 Catalunya
 Pascot
 Mas-Bresson

References 

Perpignan 5